Moon Hyun-Jung (born 6 May 1984) is a South Korean table tennis player. Her highest career ITTF ranking was 19.

References

1984 births
Living people
South Korean female table tennis players
Asian Games medalists in table tennis
Table tennis players at the 2006 Asian Games
Table tennis players at the 2010 Asian Games
Asian Games bronze medalists for South Korea
Medalists at the 2006 Asian Games
Medalists at the 2010 Asian Games
21st-century South Korean women